Acalypha dictyoneura is a species of flowering plant in the family Euphorbiaceae. It is endemic to Ecuador, where it grows in the cloud forests of the Andes. There are six known populations.

References

dictyoneura
Endemic flora of Ecuador
Near threatened plants
Taxonomy articles created by Polbot